The American Beverage Association (ABA) is a government lobbying group that represents the beverage industry in the United States. Its members include producers and bottlers of soft drinks, such as The Coca-Cola Company, PepsiCo, and Keurig Dr Pepper, along with other non-alcoholic beverages.

History 
The organization was founded in 1919, and originally named the American Bottlers of Carbonated Beverages.  In 1966, it renamed itself the National Soft Drink Association.  Then in November 2004, it changed to its current name, "to better reflect the expanded range of nonalcoholic beverages the industry produces."

Leadership 
Its members are bottling companies and other beverage industry firms, including
Bulldog Americas Corporation, several Coca-Cola and Pepsi-Cola bottlers, Pepsi-Americas Inc, and Royal Crown Bottling Corporation.

Lobbying
The American Beverage Association's lobbying efforts have recently skyrocketed, largely to finance the industry's opposition to legislators’ considering increased taxes on soft drinks given their impact on Americans' health.  The Association annual spent about $391,000 to more than $690,000 annually on lobbying from 2003 to 2008.  In the 2010 election cycle, its lobbying grew more than 1000 percent to $8.67 million. These funds are helping to pay for 25 lobbyists at seven different lobbying firms.

Latest news
In September 2009, a New England Journal of Medicine study called for taxes on sugar-sweetened beverages saying that these actions would cut rates of diet-related diseases and health care costs. Written by experts in nutrition, public health and economics, the study called for an excise tax of a penny per ounce on soft drinks and other beverages that have added sweeteners such as sucrose, high fructose corn syrup or fruit-juice concentrates. The expectation is that such a tax could reduce calorie consumption from sweetened beverages by 10% and create revenue that governments could use to pay for health programs. A report on the New England Journal of Medicine study can be read here

To counter these pro-tax efforts, the American Beverage Association and other beverage industry companies have established an "Americans Against Food Taxes" coalition and website. Their efforts include national advertising and other actions positioning the proposed taxes as "taxing hard-working families." This group's actions have been opposed by pro-tax organizations including the Center for Science in the Public Interest.

To date, 33 states have taxes on soft drinks but they are "too low to affect consumption and the revenues are not earmarked for health programs," according to the New England Journal of Medicine study.

See also

Maureen Storey, senior vice president for science policy and author of many of the ABA's press releases and official statements

References

External links

"Beverage group: Pull soda from primary schools", USAToday, August 17, 2005
"After soda ban nutritionists say more can be done", Boston Globe, May 4, 2006
"Critics Say Soda Policy for Schools Lacks Teeth The New York Times, August 22, 2005
OpenSecrets, ABA profile
Sourcewatch, ABA profile

Trade associations based in the United States
Organizations established in 1919
1919 establishments in the United States
Drink companies of the United States